Roger Ford is a film and television production designer.

Career
He is represented by over forty film and television credits on his module in the Internet Movie Database. Ford was nominated for an Academy Award for Best Art Direction for the film Babe (1995).

Filmography and television work

References

External links

Year of birth missing (living people)
Living people
American production designers
American television people
Best Production Design AACTA Award winners